The Aylesbury Vale (or Vale of Aylesbury) is a geographical region in Buckinghamshire, England, which is bounded by the City of Milton Keynes and West Northamptonshire to the north, Central Bedfordshire and the Borough of Dacorum (Hertfordshire) to the east, the Chiltern Hills to the south and South Oxfordshire to the west. It is named after Aylesbury, the county town of Buckinghamshire. Winslow and Buckingham are among the larger towns in the vale.

The bed of the vale is largely made up of clay that was formed at the end of the ice age.

In the 2011 UK census the population of Aylesbury Vale was 174,900. In the 2001 UK census the population of Aylesbury Vale was 165,748, representing an increase since 1991 of 18,600 people. About half of those live in the county town Aylesbury.

Government

Aylesbury Vale was administered as a local government district of northern Buckinghamshire, with its own 
district council between 1974 and 2020. The council's offices were in Aylesbury. The district council's logo included the historical figure of John Hampden. The district was formed on 1 April 1974 by the merger of the boroughs of Aylesbury and Buckingham, Aylesbury Rural District, Buckingham Rural District, Wing Rural District and part of Winslow Rural District. Aylesbury Vale was absorbed into the new unitary Buckinghamshire Council on 1 April 2020.

There are 111 civil parishes in the area of the former non-metropolitan district: 84 with a parish council, including three town councils (Aylesbury, Buckingham and Winslow), and a further 27 operating with a Parish meeting, see list of civil parishes in Aylesbury Vale.

Literature
The Aylesbury Vale countryside is described in the English novel The War Hero.

Tourism
The Vale has a number of historic buildings and landscapes which are tourist attractions. The National Trust owns several properties including Waddesdon Manor, Claydon House and the landscaped gardens at Stowe House. The Silverstone Circuit sits on the northern boundary of the Vale with South Northamptonshire, and the Buckinghamshire Railway Centre is located near Quainton. Aylesbury is home to the County Museum (which includes the Roald Dahl Children's Gallery), and Buckingham features the Old Gaol Museum.

Transport
There are no motorway junctions in the Vale although the M40 does cross it for five miles between junctions 8A and 9. The A41 road, the A413 road and the A418 road meet at Aylesbury. The A421 road passes through the north of the Vale providing connections to Milton Keynes, Bedford and the M1 to the east, and the M40, Oxford and Birmingham to the west.

The Vale is well-served by rail connections to the capital, containing several railway stations on the London to Aylesbury Line- the major station being Aylesbury. At Aylesbury there are connecting services to Princes Risborough station. In addition, the Chiltern main line passes through the district, stopping at Haddenham & Thame Parkway station, and the West Coast Main Line passes through the Vale twice along its eastern borders, stopping at nearby Milton Keynes.

HS2 will run northwest, passing Wendover, Aylesbury and largely following the former Great Central Main Line route. There are also proposals for a branch line from East West Rail, to run from Claydon LNE Junction via  to Aylesbury, which were discussed in Parliament in 2021. The proposal remains "under review" and is not in any current plans. (The route of HS2 uses the same corridor and, the Claydon line is needed to move materials for its engineering works.)

References 

 
Former non-metropolitan districts
Non-metropolitan districts of Buckinghamshire